Chris Clark   (born 9 June 1984) is an English former footballer. He played in the Football League for Stoke City.

Career
Clark was born in Shoreham-by-Sea and joined Portsmouth in 2000. He was loaned out to Stoke City in February 2005 and played in three matches during the 2004–05 season before returning to Portsmouth where he was then released. He went on to play non-league football with Bognor Regis Town.

Career statistics
Source:

References

External links
 

1984 births
Living people
English footballers
Stoke City F.C. players
Portsmouth F.C. players
Bognor Regis Town F.C. players
English Football League players
Association football midfielders